Wanda Coleman (November 13, 1946 – November 22, 2013) was an American poet.  She was known as "the L.A. Blueswoman" and "the unofficial poet laureate of Los Angeles".

Biography
Wanda Evans was born in the Watts neighborhood of Los Angeles, where she grew up during the 1950s and 1960s. She is the eldest of four children. Her parents were George and Lewana (Scott) Evans, who were introduced to one another at church by his aunt. In 1931, her father had relocated to Los Angeles from Little Rock, Arkansas, after the lynching of a young man who was hung from a church steeple. He was an ex-boxer and long-time friend and sparring partner of Light Heavyweight Champion Archie Moore. In Los Angeles, he ran a sign shop during the day and worked the graveyard shift as a janitor at RCA Victor Records. Her mother worked as a seamstress and as a housekeeper for Ronald Reagan, among other celebrities.

After graduating from John C. Fremont High School in Los Angeles, Wanda Evans enrolled at Los Angeles Valley College in Van Nuys, California. She transferred to California State University at Los Angeles, but did not complete a degree.

Shortly after finishing high school, she married white Southerner Charles Coleman, a troubleshooter for the Student Non-Violent Coordinating Committee (SNCC) in the 1960s. Their union produced two children, Luanda and Anthony. She went on to marry two more times. Her second marriage produced her second son, Ian. Her third husband was poet Austin Straus, whom she married in 1981.

After divorcing her first husband, Coleman worked a variety of jobs to make ends meet as a single mother, including waiting, typing, and editing a soft-core pornography magazine. She wrote for a number of men's magazines under the pseudonym Andrew L. Tate.

She and Straus hosted a radio show, Pacifica Radio's "Poetry Connexion", from 1981 to 1996. On the show they interviewed both local and internationally known writers.

Within her writing, whether it be fiction, essays, or poetry, Coleman introduces and develops characters whose lives bring to light social inequalities.

Coleman received fellowships from the John Simon Guggenheim Foundation, the National Endowment for the Arts, and the California Arts Council (in fiction and in poetry). She was the first C.O.L.A. Literary Fellow (Los Angeles Department of Cultural Affairs, 2003). Her honors included an Emmy in Daytime Drama writing (the first African American woman to receive such an honor), the 1999 Lenore Marshall Prize (for Bathwater Wine), and a finalist for the 2001 National Book Awards (for Mercurochrome). She was a finalist for California poet laureate (2005).

In 2020, Black Sparrow Press, Coleman's longtime publisher, released Wicked Enchantment: Selected Poems, Edited & Introduced by Terrance Hayes. The collection draws work from all of Coleman's Black Sparrow Press books, which spanned from 1983 to 2005. Author Mary Karr wrote "Wicked Enchantment has words to crack you open and heal you where it counts—hateful and hilarious, heartbroken and hellbent."

Wicked Enchantment: Selected Poems quickly received critical acclaim upon publication. In a piece for the New Yorker entitled "The Fearless Invention of One of L.A.'s Greatest Poets," critic Dan Chiasson wrote "One of the greatest poets ever to come out of L.A., she shaped the city's literary scene like few before her. . . . Rarely does a poet seem to want to take an already brutally brief form and speed it up. But Coleman's sonnets are sprints, which is what makes their improvisations, modelled on American blues and jazz, so compelling."

Writing online for Poetry in a piece entitled "Heart First Into This Ruin", Lizzy LeRud wrote: "Today, Coleman's significance is unquestioned.... In Wicked Enchantment, Coleman's fans, new and old, will find some of her most vital challenges to American racism and its market-driven culture, rendered in her uniquely unsettling lyric voice. Her work pushes us to confront injustice with as much candor as she did—and with as much care."

As of 2022, Wanda Coleman has published fifteen poetry books and chapbooks, two mixed-genre books (poetry and fiction), two book of short stories, one novel, and two books of nonfiction.

Controversy
While critically acclaimed for her creative writing, Coleman's brush with notoriety came as a result of an unfavorable review she wrote in the April 14, 2002, issue of the Los Angeles Times Book Review  of Maya Angelou's book A Song Flung Up to Heaven.  Coleman found the book to be "small and inauthentic, without ideas wisdom or vision".  Coleman's review provoked positive and negative responses, including the cancellation of events and the rescinding of invitations.  Her account of this incident appears in the September 16, 2002, edition of The Nation.

Books
Heart First Into This Ruin: The Complete American Sonnets. Black Sparrow Press. 2022.

The Love Project. (with Austin Straus). Red Hen Press. 2014

Ostinato Vamps. Pitt Poetry Series, 2003–2004. 
 (National Book Awards finalist)

 Heavy Daughter Blues: Poems & Stories 1968-1986 Black Sparrow Press. 1987.
Imagoes. Black Sparrow Press. 1983.

Chapbooks & Limited Editions
Moon Cherries. Sore Dove Press. 2005.
Wanda Coleman: Greatest Hits 1966-2003. Pudding House Publications. 2004.
American Sonnets. Woodland Pattern. 1994.
The Dicksboro Hotel & Other Travels. Ambrosia Press. 1989.
Art in the Court of the Blue Fag. Black Sparrow Press. 1977.

Further reading

"Revising Western Criticism Through Wanda Coleman," essay by Krista Comer; Western American Literature: The Journal of the Western Literature Association, Vol. XXXIII, No. 4., Utah State University, Dept. of English, Logan UT, Winter 1999.
"Literature and Race in Los Angeles," by Julian Murphet, Cambridge University Press, 2001.
AMERICAN WRITERS: A Collection of Literary Biographies, Jay Parini, Editor, article by Tony Magistrale, 2002.
"City of Poems: The Lyric Voice in Los Angeles Since 1990," by Laurence Goldstein, from THE MISREAD CITY: New Literary Los Angeles, Dana Gioia and Scott Timberg, Editors, Red Hen Press, 2003.
"What Saves Us" interview of Coleman by Priscilla Ann Brown, Callaloo Vol. 26, No.3, Dept. of English, Texas A & M University, 2003.
"Wanda Coleman" biographical essay, A-Z of African American Writers, Philip Bader, Editor, Facts-on-File, NY, 2004.
"Wanda Coleman," cover and interview by Jeff Jensen, Chiron Review, Issue 79, Summer 2005.
"Wanda Coleman," featured poet in Quercus Review #6, Sam Pierstorff, Editor, Dept. of English, Modesto Junior College, California, 2006.
"The Fearless Invention of One of L.A.'s Greatest Poets," by Dan Chiasson in The New Yorker, May 18, 2020.

References

External links
Wanda Coleman at Black Sparrow Press

Academy of American Poets profile
 Review of Wanda Coleman
Wanda Coleman on AALBC.com
Wanda Coleman on Brickbat Revue

 Wicked Enchantment: Poems by Wanda Coleman on Penguin Random House

Poets from California
1946 births
2013 deaths
African-American poets
American women poets
American soap opera writers
Women soap opera writers
20th-century American poets
20th-century American women writers
Screenwriters from California
Writers from Los Angeles
African-American screenwriters
20th-century African-American women writers
20th-century African-American writers
21st-century African-American people
21st-century African-American women